The 2007 Bristol City Council election took place on 3 May 2007, on the same day as other local elections. The Liberal Democrats lost two seats to Labour, but remained the largest party on the Council. No party gained overall control.

Ward results

Ashley

Bedminster

Bishopsworth

Brislington East

Brislington West

Cabot

Clifton

Clifton East

Cotham

Easton

Eastville

Filwood

Frome Vale

Hartcliffe

Hengrove

Hillfields

Knowle

Lawrence Hill

Southville

St George East

St George West

Stockwood

Whitchurch Park

Windmill Hill

References

2007 English local elections
2007
2000s in Bristol